Terra Amata is an early fictional novel by French Nobel laureate J. M. G. Le Clézio.

Plot summary
Terra Amata is about a man named Chancelade, and his detailed view of an otherwise ordinary life, from his early childhood to his grave.

Terra Amata is an archaeological site near the French town of Nice.

Critical reception
Terra Amata was perceived to center on the "perceptions and activities" of "its protagonist" Chancelade
The work seems to have been "designed to overload the senses"
According to one critic "Chancelade has done nothing, suffered nothing, experienced nothing to make him worth our regard." The story is that of Chancelade, from childhood to death; he sees the world in minute detail...""Terra Amata,"  combines Le Clézio's game-playing as the author with a savage lyricism reminiscent of Thomas Hardy.

References

External links

1967 French novels
Novels by J. M. G. Le Clézio
Works by J. M. G. Le Clézio
Éditions Gallimard books